David Michael Richardson (born September 9, 1981) is a former American football cornerback.

College career
Richardson attended Cal Poly out of St. Bernard High School, and was a letterman in football. As a Mustang senior, he won AFCA All-America honors, and started all of the team's 11 games and recorded five interceptions returned for 105 yards and two touchdowns, plus 50 tackles, seven pass deflections and a sack. As a junior, he garnered three interceptions and 57 tackles.

Late in the 2003 season, Richardson accepted an invitation to the Las Vegas All-American Classic showcase game. He was selected as Cal Poly's Male Athlete of the Year following his senior season.

Professional career

Jacksonville Jaguars
Richardson signed an undrafted free-agent contract with the Jacksonville Jaguars in April 2004. He spent his first two years as a reserve cornerback, wearing jersey number 26.

After unsuccessfully competing for a starting job in 2005, he was relegated to special teams. He moved to safety during the 2006 training camp due to the team's glut of cornerbacks.

Los Angeles Avengers
Richardson signed with the Los Angeles Avengers of the Arena Football League in 2008.

Jacksonville Sharks
Richardson signed with the Jacksonville Sharks in 2011.

Philadelphia Soul
Richardson signed with the Philadelphia Soul in 2013.

References

External links
NFL.com player page
Jacksonville Sharks Bio

1981 births
Living people
Sportspeople from Los Angeles County, California
Players of American football from California
American football cornerbacks
American football safeties
Cal Poly Mustangs football players
Jacksonville Jaguars players
Los Angeles Avengers players
Jacksonville Sharks players
Philadelphia Soul players